Thomas Nazlidis (born 20 October 1987) is a retired Greek professional footballer who last played as a forward for Football League club Triglia.

Career
Strong technically, skilful with a good shot and delivery from the inside, as well as from dead balls, Nazlidis played from 2011 to 2015 for Cretan side Platanias, but due to limit participation time, he decided to leave the club. On January 20, 2015 he was released on a free transfer. He scored twenty three goals in seventy seven matches in both Superleague Greece & Football League. On 23 January 2015, he signed a contract with the Macedonian club Veria, returning close to his homeland, Thessaloniki where he comes from.

Nazlidis made his debut against Olympiacos on 1 February 2015, as he replaced Alexandros Vergonis. Nazlidis scored his first goal for Veria in a 1–1 home draw against PAS Giannina, on 23 August 2015, equalizing Noé Acosta's goal with a header. Nazlidis gave an assist to Djamel Abdoun to his first goal that he scored in an away match against Panthrakikos on 29 August 2015. On 25 October 2015, seconds before the final whistle blow, he scored the winning goal in a 1–0 away win against Panionios.

On 2 July 2016, Nazlidis signed a 3-years contract with Super League club AEL. He scored 9 goals in the season and was one of the club's key players especially in the first round.

On 28 August 2017, he scored his first goal for the 2017-18 season in a 1–1 home draw against Asteras Tripoli. On 28 October 2017 he scored in the 95th minute, giving his team an important home win against Levadiakos.
 On 21 December 2017 he scored a brace in a 3–0 home win against Xanthi for the first leg of the round of 16 of the Greek Cup. On 14 January 2018, he scored in a 3–1 away defeat against Asteras Tripoli. On 1 March 2018, he scored in a 2–1 home win against AEK Athens for the first leg of the semi-finals of the Greek Cup. On 15 April 2018, he scored in an emphatic 4–2 home win against Panetolikos. On 27 April 2018, it was announced that Nazlidis, along with two other teammates, would leave the team at the end of the season.

On 29 June 2018, June Nazlidis joined Aris on a two-year deal. On 5 January 2019, he cut ties with the club.

On 5 January 2019, he signed a contract with Apollon Smyrnis another Super League club till the end of the 2018–19 season.

Career statistics

Club

References

External links

1987 births
Living people
Greek footballers
Super League Greece players
Athlitiki Enosi Larissa F.C. players
Platanias F.C. players
Kavala F.C. players
Veria F.C. players
Association football forwards
Footballers from Thessaloniki